Teratopora acosma is a moth in the family Erebidae. It was described by Alfred Jefferis Turner in 1899. It is found in Australia, where it has been recorded from Queensland and Victoria. The habitat consists of wet tropical areas.

References

Moths described in 1899
Lithosiina